Baptisia nuttalliana is a species of flowering plant in the legume family known by the common name Nuttall's wild indigo. It is found in the south-central United States.

References

Sophoreae